Andrew Connolly (born 30 November 1965) is an Irish stage and screen actor and director.

Biography
Connolly was born in Dublin, Ireland in 1965 and was raised in the Finglas and Ringsend areas.

At sixteen years old he left school for a seven-month stint in the Merchant Navy, and later served eighteen months of "torture" in the Irish Navy before returning to Dublin, where he became involved in the Dublin Youth Theater. Connolly began his screen career with a recurring role in the RTÉ television series Inside in 1985, with his first film role coming three years later opposite Gabriel Byrne in The Courier. Connolly received roles in several high-profile projects in the 1990s, including the film adaptation of the Tom Clancy novel Patriot Games in 1993, and he received a Best Actor nomination for his portrayal of an abusive soldier in 1995's Guiltrip.

In 1997, Connolly, his wife (actress Karen Woodley), and their two children relocated to Los Angeles. He had roles in several acclaimed television series, including Lost, Heroes, and The Closer. He wrote and directed the short film Flush in 2003, and made his feature film directoral debut with 2008's Quest for the Meaning of Life . Connolly's most recent role was as ex-con Paddy Bishop in Fair City.

Filmography

References

External links
 

1965 births
Living people
Male actors from Dublin (city)
Irish male film actors
Irish male television actors
Irish expatriates in the United States
Expatriate male actors in the United States
Irish Naval Service personnel
Irish male soap opera actors